Trimethylamine-corrinoid protein Co-methyltransferase (mttB (gene), trimethylamine methyltransferase) is an enzyme with systematic name trimethylamine:5-hydroxybenzimidazolylcobamide Co-methyltransferase. This enzyme catalyses the following chemical reaction

 trimethylamine + [Co(I) trimethylamine-specific corrinoid protein]  [methyl-Co(III) trimethylamine-specific corrinoid protein] + dimethylamine

This enzyme is involved in methanogenesis from trimethylamine.

References

External links 
 

EC 2.1.1